Events from the year 1793 in Denmark.

Incumbents
 Monarch – Christian VII
 Prime minister – Andreas Peter Bernstorff

Events
 4 September – A royal decree reduces the number of counties (Danish: amt, pl. amter) to 20.

Undated

Births
 22 April – Ludvig Bødtcher, lyric poet (died 1874)
 28 October – Princess Caroline of Denmark (died 1881)

Deaths
 15 September – Johan Theodor Holmskjold, botanist, civil servant (born 1731)
 14 October – Thomas Kingo, bishop, poet and hymn-writer (born 1634)

References

 
1790s in Denmark
Denmark
Years of the 18th century in Denmark